Marie Hedwig of Hesse-Darmstadt (26 November 1647 in Giessen – 19 April 1680 in Ichtershausen) was a landgravine of Hesse-Darmstadt by birth and by marriage Duchess of Saxe-Meiningen.

Life 
She was the youngest daughter of landgrave George II of Hesse-Darmstadt (1605-1661) and his wife Sophia Eleonore (1609-1671), the daughter of Elector John George I of Saxony.

On 20 November 1671 at Friedenstein Castle in Gotha, she married Bernhard I, who at the time ruled Saxe-Gotha jointly with his brothers, and later became the first Duke of Saxe-Meiningen.  In 1676, the couple took up residence in Ichtershausen.  Bernhard built a castle here, which he named Marienburg, after Marie Hadwig.

In 1680, Bernhard I and his brothers divided Saxe-Gotha and Bernhard became the first Duke of Saxe-Meiningen.  His newly created duchy consisted of the former principality of Henneberg.  The coat of arms of Henneberg showed a black hen.  At the time, this was seen as a symbol of magic and witchcraft.  Shortly before the scheduled move from their residence in Ichtershausen to Meiningen, Marie Hedwig stated that she would never enter the land of the black hen.  She died later that year, after giving birth to her seventh child.  She was only 32 years old, and died 9 weeks before the scheduled move to Meiningen.  She was buried in the crypt of the city church in Meiningen.

Bernhard I decorated the Hesse hall in Elisabethenburg Palace in Meiningen in a baroque style in her memory, and hung portraits of the two dynasties in this hall.

Issue 
From her marriage, Marie Hedwig had the following children:
 Ernest Louis (October 1672 in Gotha – 24 November 1724 in Meiningen)
 Bernhard (28 October 1673 in Gotha – 25 October 1694 in Brussels)
 John Ernest (29 December 1674 in Gotha – 8 February 1675 in Gotha)
 Marie Elisabeth (11 August 1676 in Ichtershausen – 22 December 1676 in Ichtershausen)
 John George (3 October 1677 in Ichtershausen – Ichtershausen, 10 October 1678 in Ichtershausen)
 Frederick Wilhelm (16 February 1679 in Ichtershausen – 10 March 1746 in Meiningen).
 George Ernest (26 March 1680 in Ichtershausen – 1 January 1699 in Meiningen); he died of smallpox

References 
 Ernst Julius Walch: Historische, statistische, geographische und topographische Beschreibung der Königlich- und Herzoglich-Sächsischen Häuser und Lande überhaupt und des Sachsen-Coburg-Meiningischen Hauses und dessen Lande insonderheit, Nuremberg, 1811, p. 71 Online
 Ludwig Bechstein: Mythe, Sage, Märe und Fabel im Leben und Bewusstsein des deutschen Volkes, t.D. Weigel, Leipzig, 1854, p. 259 Online
 Matthias Müller: Das Schloss als Bild des Fürsten, Vandenhoeck & Ruprecht, Göttingen, 2004, p. 396 Online

External links 
 Genealogy of the House of Wettin

German duchesses
House of Hesse
1647 births
1680 deaths
17th-century German people
Daughters of monarchs